USS Pledge is the name of two United States Navy minesweepers:

 , commissioned in 1944
 , commissioned in 1956

References

United States Navy ship names